The 2020 Auburn Tigers baseball team will represent Auburn University in the 2020 NCAA Division I baseball season. The Tigers will play their home games at Plainsman Park.

Previous season

The Tigers finished 38–28 overall, and 14–16 in the conference. The Tigers won the Atlanta Regional and the Chapel Hill Super Regional in the 2019 NCAA Division I baseball tournament  to advance to the College World Series for the first time since 1997.

Schedule and results

Schedule Source:
*Rankings are based on the team's current ranking in the D1Baseball poll.

2020 MLB draft

References

Auburn
Auburn Tigers baseball seasons
Auburn Tigers baseball